|}

The Supreme Novices' Hurdle is a Grade 1 National Hunt hurdle race in Great Britain which is open to horses aged four years or older. It is run on the Old Course at Cheltenham over a distance of about 2 miles and ½ furlong (2 miles and 87 yards, or ), and during its running there are eight hurdles to be jumped. The race is for novice hurdlers, and it is scheduled to take place each year during the Cheltenham Festival in March.

It is the first event on the opening day of the Festival, and its start is traditionally greeted by the "Cheltenham Roar", a loud cheer generated by the crowds of onlookers.

History
The race was originally called the Gloucestershire Hurdle, and it used to be split into two or three separate divisions. The Irish trainer Vincent O'Brien recorded ten victories in the race during an eight-year spell in the 1950s.

It became known as the Lloyds Bank Champion Novices' Hurdle in 1974, when Lloyds Bank began a brief period of sponsorship. Its present title was introduced when Waterford Crystal started to back the race in 1978. This association continued until 1990, and since then the event has had several different sponsors. The current sponsor as of 2021 is the bookmaking company Sky Bet.

Records
Leading jockey since 1972 (6 wins):
 Ruby Walsh – Noland (2006), Al Ferof (2011), Champagne Fever (2013), Vautour (2014), Douvan (2015), Klassical Dream (2019)

Leading trainer since 1972 (7 wins):

 Willie Mullins – Tourist Attraction (1995), Ebaziyan (2007), Champagne Fever (2013), Vautour (2014), Douvan (2015), Klassical Dream (2019), Appreciate It (2021)

Winners since 1946
 Separate divisions of the race indicated by (1), (2) and (3).

See also
 Horse racing in Great Britain
 List of British National Hunt races

References

 Racing Post:

External links
 Supreme Novices' Hurdle – Cheltenham Pedigree Online Thoroughbred Database
 
 Race Recordings Supreme Novices' Hurdle YouTube

National Hunt races in Great Britain
Cheltenham Racecourse
National Hunt hurdle races